Real Time Governance Society (RTGS) is an Indian e-governance initiative of chief minister N. Chandrababu Naidu from Andhra Pradesh, India. It was formed on 6 September 2017. The department reports to the chief minister.

History 
The idea is to use electronic communication and technology to deploy e-governance in Andhra Pradesh. It has 13 district centers and 1 state center for reporting. Data from Andhra Pradesh Weather Forecasting and Early Warning Research Center, drones, machine learning systems, biometric systems and other surveillance systems are collated and reported through the RTGS system in real-time. A call center addresses internal grievances.

Applications of RTGs

The RTGS system has been used by N. Chandrababu Naidu to evaluate the performance of MLA's from his party. When setting up meetings with party leaders prior to the 2019 elections, he used to warn the MLAs that he had all the information about them and that he would only field candidates who had the potential to win. For the same, the Chief Minister received input as well as data broken down by the constituency. The same was also used to ensure none of his ministers partook in any sand mining activity which the opposition had often attacked his party about. 

Using the RTGS and IVRS technologies, the Andhra Pradesh government sent messages to about Nine Lakh people during the impending ‘Phethai Cyclone’ to minimise the loss of human life. About the effectiveness of RTGS, Chandrababu Naidu observed: "We have beaten IMD in predicting the exact location of where the cyclone made the landfall".

Awards

During TDP tenure, the State won 615 National and International awards which is a testimony to the N. Chandrababu Naidu's government’s performance.

References

External links 
 Official website

Administration of Andhra Pradesh
Digital India initiatives
Internet in India